Dichaetanthera is a genus of flowering plants belonging to the family Melastomataceae.

Its native range is Tropical Africa, Madagascar.

Species:

Dichaetanthera africana 
Dichaetanthera altissima 
Dichaetanthera arborea 
Dichaetanthera articulata 
Dichaetanthera asperrima 
Dichaetanthera bifida 
Dichaetanthera brevicauda 
Dichaetanthera ciliata 
Dichaetanthera cordifolia 
Dichaetanthera cornifrons 
Dichaetanthera corymbosa 
Dichaetanthera crassinodis 
Dichaetanthera decaryi 
Dichaetanthera echinulata 
Dichaetanthera erici-rosenii 
Dichaetanthera grandifolia 
Dichaetanthera heteromorpha 
Dichaetanthera hirsuta 
Dichaetanthera lancifolia 
Dichaetanthera lutescens 
Dichaetanthera madagascariensis 
Dichaetanthera matitanensis 
Dichaetanthera oblongifolia 
Dichaetanthera parvifolia 
Dichaetanthera rhodesiensis 
Dichaetanthera rosea 
Dichaetanthera rutenbergiana 
Dichaetanthera sambiranensis 
Dichaetanthera scabra 
Dichaetanthera schatzii 
Dichaetanthera schuilingiana 
Dichaetanthera squamata 
Dichaetanthera strigosa 
Dichaetanthera trichopoda 
Dichaetanthera tsaratanensis 
Dichaetanthera verdcourtii 
Dichaetanthera villosissima

References

Melastomataceae
Melastomataceae genera